Mean Creek is a 2004 American coming-of-age psychological drama film written and directed by Jacob Aaron Estes and starring Rory Culkin, Ryan Kelley, Scott Mechlowicz, Trevor Morgan, Josh Peck, and Carly Schroeder. It was produced by Susan Johnson, Rick Rosenthal, and Hagai Shaham.

The film is about a group of teenagers who devise a plan to get revenge on an overweight, troubled bully on a boating trip. When their plan goes too far, they have to deal with the unexpected consequences of their actions. The film premiered at the Sundance Film Festival on January 15, 2004, and was later screened at the Cannes Film Festival on May 14, 2004. It was then given a limited release in major US cities on August 20, 2004, mostly playing at art house theaters.

Plot
Small and quiet Sam admits to his older brother Rocky that the school bully George has hurt him because he moved George's video camera while George was filming himself playing basketball. Rocky tells his friends, reserved Clyde and troubled Marty, and they devise a plan for revenge. Part of the prank entails taking George on a boating trip to celebrate Sam's fictional birthday. Then, they will get him to strip in a game of truth or dare, throw him in the river, and make him run home naked.

Sam invites his new girlfriend Millie along and all five of them are driven to the river by Marty. During the ride, George reveals a different side by being genuinely pleased to be invited; the group also learns he is dyslexic. However, Sam does not tell Millie the real plan until they arrive near the river. Millie refuses to continue until Sam promises to call the plan off. Sam tells Rocky, who then tells Clyde and Marty. Although Clyde has no problem, Marty is very reluctant. Throughout the trip, George clumsily attempts to fit in with the group. Despite this, he also gets confrontational when questioned about his motives (or lack thereof). The group soon realizes that although George is annoying, he is very lonely and just wants to be socially accepted.

On the boat, Marty deviates from the others' plan and initiates a game of truth or dare, though the rest decide to go along. After George shoots Marty with a water gun in good fun, he makes a funny quip about Marty's father, not remembering that it is a sore subject as Marty's father committed suicide years before. This sets off Marty, who exposes the whole plan and starts to ridicule George. Angered and humiliated, George launches into a vulgar tirade against everyone else, ending by crudely mocking Marty's deceased father and Clyde's two gay fathers. As Rocky tries to stop the fight, he accidentally pushes George off the boat.

Unable to swim, George struggles to remain afloat in the water. As the others regard the scene in terror, George accidentally hits his head with his video camera and does not come to the surface. Rocky dives into the water and finds George, who is face down in the shallow water close to the shore. Millie attempts to give George CPR, but is too late as George is already dead. The group is traumatized and in fear of being incarcerated. They dig a hole and bury George's body.

Clyde's plan is to explain that it was an accident but Marty threatens him, reminding Clyde that George's camera (now lost in the water) contains Marty's taped confession of the original plan and the authorities will find out if the camera is discovered. As they had already tricked George into not telling his mother where he was going, she would not know of their involvement. They later gather at Sam and Rocky's house. Sam, Rocky, Clyde, and Millie are willing to accept the consequences for their actions as opposed to having George's death hanging over their heads. Marty refuses to turn himself in and feels betrayed.

Marty storms out and convinces his brother to give him his gun and car. He robs a gas station and drives off, becoming a fugitive. Meanwhile, the others go to George's house and confess to his mother. Sam is later seen in an interrogation room, telling the story to the police, who later find and view the tape from George's video camera. In a final scene, audio of George explaining his dream of becoming a filmmaker and documenting his life in hopes those who see it will finally understand him plays in the background. The police force, Sam, his father, and George's mother find the location of the corpse. As the sheriff exhumes George's body, Sam watches on in regret and George's mother cries with sorrow.

Cast

Production
Mean Creek was originally conceived by director Jacob Aaron Estes around 1996 and 1997. At the time, Estes felt that there were very few films about kids dealing with a tragedy, a genre he had always admired both as a kid and as an adult student of film. The film was independently financed with a budget of $500,000, although about $350,000 of it was spent off screen or donated. It was shot mostly in Clackamas County, Oregon, including the cities of Boring, Sandy, and Estacada, though footage on the river was filmed on the Lewis River in southwest Washington.

Release

Box office
Mean Creek received a limited release in North America in four theaters and grossed $29,170 with an average of $7,292 per theater. The film earned $603,951 domestically and $198,997 internationally for a total of $802,948. Based on a $500,000 budget, the film can be considered a modest box office success.

Critical reception
On Rotten Tomatoes, Mean Creek has an 89% approval rating based on 124 reviews with an average rating of 7.3/10. The site's critical consensus reads "Mean Creek is an uncomfortably riveting glimpse into the casual cruelty of youth." Additionally, the film also holds a 74/100 score on Metacritic based on 31 reviews, indicating "generally favorable reviews".

Roger Ebert praised the acting and concept of teenagers making conscious moral decisions and wrote "Mean Creek joins a small group of films including River's Edge and Bully which deal accurately and painfully with the consequences of peer-driven behavior. Kids who would not possibly act by themselves form groups that cannot stop themselves. This movie would be an invaluable tool for moral education in schools, for discussions of situational ethics and refusing to go along with the crowd."

See also
 Dyslexia in popular culture

References

External links

 
 
 
 
 
 Screenplay at Drew's Script-o-rama
 Official trailer posted by Carly Schroeder on YouTube

2004 films
2004 crime drama films
2004 directorial debut films
2004 independent films
2000s American films
2000s coming-of-age drama films
2000s English-language films
2000s psychological drama films
2000s teen drama films
American coming-of-age drama films
American crime drama films
American films about revenge
American independent films
American psychological drama films
American teen drama films
Films about autism
Films about bullying
Films about disability in the United States
Films about pranks
Films directed by Jacob Aaron Estes
Films scored by Tomandandy
Films set in Oregon
Films shot in Oregon
Films shot in Washington (state)
John Cassavetes Award winners
Paramount Vantage films
Paramount Pictures films
Focus Features films
Teen crime films
Whitewater Films films